Forsskaolea procridifolia is a species of flowering plants of the family Urticaceae. The species is endemic to Cape Verde. It is listed as near threatened by the IUCN.

The species occurs in most of the islands of Cape Verde, except Boa Vista. It is found from sea level up to 1,700 metres elevation.

References

Further reading

procridifolia
Endemic flora of Cape Verde